Pavoraja is a genus of skates in the family Arhynchobatidae from deeper waters off Australia.

Description
Pavoraja are relatively small skates. The disc is semi-oval to heart-shaped. The snout has a small fleshy process at the tip.

Species
There are six species:
Pavoraja alleni McEachran & Fechhelm, 1982 (Allen's skate)
Pavoraja arenaria Last, Mallick & Yearsley, 2008 (Sandy skate)
Pavoraja mosaica Last, Mallick & Yearsley, 2008 (Mosaic skate)
Pavoraja nitida (Günther, 1880) (Peacock Skate)
Pavoraja pseudonitida Last, Mallick & Yearsley, 2008 (False peacock skate)
Pavoraja umbrosa Last, Mallick & Yearsley, 2008 (Dusky skate)

References

 
Anacanthobatidae
Ray genera
 
Taxa named by Gilbert Percy Whitley